The Minister of Climate and the Environment is a Councilor of State and Chief of Norway's Ministry of the Environment. The current minister is Espen Barth Eide. The ministry is responsible for environmental issues, including influencing environmental impacts on other ministries. Subordinate agencies include the Directorate for Cultural Heritage, the Polar Institute, the Environment Agency and the Mapping Authority.

The minister and minister post were established on 8 May 1972. The title was known as the Minister of the Environment until 2013. Nineteen people from six parties have held the position. Thorbjørn Berntsen of the Labour Party has held the position the longest, a week short of seven years. Gro Harlem Brundtland, who held the position for five years, later became Prime Minister. Erik Solheim of the Socialist Left Party held the position concurrently with being Minister of International Development.

Key
The following lists the minister, their party, date of assuming and leaving office, their tenure in years and days, and the cabinet they served in.

Ministers

References

Climate and the Environment
 
1972 establishments in Norway